Pont Canavese is a comune (municipality) in the Metropolitan City of Turin in the Italian region Piedmont, located about  north of Turin. It occupies a small fluvial plain between the rivers Orco and Soana: its names (Pont, derived from the Latin ad duos pontes, being the Franco-Provençal word for "bridge") derives from the series of  bridges that were historically built here to cross those rivers.

Pont Canavese borders the following municipalities: Ronco Canavese, Ingria, Frassinetto, Sparone, Chiesanuova, Cuorgnè and Alpette. Sights include the archaeological site of Santa Maria in Doblazio, the church of San Costanzo (1328) and a series of towers of medieval origins, once belonging to the local most powerful families.

References

External links
 Official website

Cities and towns in Piedmont
Canavese